Beau Miles (born ) is an Australian YouTuber, educator, author, and outdoorsman.

Career 
Miles' father is a painter. Miles started as an undergraduate student in 1999 at Monash University in Melbourne, Australia. He started to lecture at Monash in outdoor education, and later earned his PhD in Outdoor Education at Monash. In 2016, Miles started his YouTube channel for his PhD project, "Bass by Kayak" in a 6-part video series. In 2021, Beau quit his job as a professor and became a full time father and YouTuber. In 2021, Beau released his first book, The Backyard Adventurer.

Adventures 
Miles is best known for his self-imposed adventures, which he films and posts to his YouTube channel. These challenges have included walking  to Monash University from his home in Jindivick, exclusively eating beans for 40 days, and running a marathon at a pace of roughly one mile every hour over a 24-hour period.

Personal life 
Miles is married to Helen Barclay, and they have a daughter together.

References

YouTube channels
Hikers
People from Victoria (Australia)
Outdoor educators
Academic staff of Monash University
Living people
Year of birth missing (living people)
Place of birth missing (living people)